Aila Inkeri Keto AO (born 14 March 1943) is founder and President of the Rainforest Conservation Society in Queensland, Australia, now known as the Australian Rainforest Conservation Society. In 2005, Keto was a recipient of the Queensland Greats Awards.

Born in Tully, Queensland, Australia, to parents of Finnish origin, Dr Keto originally studied biochemistry and worked at the University of Queensland.
 
In 1992 Keto received the IUCN Fred M. Packard Award in recognition of "outstanding service to protected and conserved areas" and in 1994 she  was awarded an Officer of the Order of Australia for “service to conservation, particularly through promoting the protection and management of the wet tropical rainforests of Queensland”.
 She was nominated as Queenslander of the Year in 2000 and in 2001 she was awarded the Centenary Medal, "for service as an expert on wet tropics and as a leading conservationist and academic".

In 2005 Dr Keto was awarded the Volvo Environment Prize for her work which, led to the protection of more than 15,000 km² of Queensland's rainforest.  This is only one of a series of awards that have been given to her for her environmental and conservation work which has resulted in three successful nominations for world heritage status: Wet Tropics, Fraser Island and the Central Eastern Rainforest Reserves of Australia (now Gondwana Rainforests of Australia).

References

External links
 Fourteenth Romeo Lahey Memorial Lecture by Aila Keto
 

1943 births
Living people
Australian environmentalists
Australian women environmentalists
Officers of the Order of Australia
Queensland Greats
Australian people of Finnish descent